National Harbor is a census-designated place (CDP) in Prince George's County, Maryland, United States, located along the Potomac River near the Woodrow Wilson Bridge and just south of Washington, D.C. It originated as a  multi-use waterfront development. Per the 2020 census, the population was 5,509.

History

Land use and rezoning

The land developed for National Harbor was previously Salubria Plantation, built in 1827 by Dr. John H. Bayne. The plantation house burned down in 1981 and was offered for sale along with the surrounding land. The land was sold in 1984 and in 1994 was rezoned for mixed-use development. In the fall of 1997, the Maryland Department of the Environment and the Army Corps of Engineers approved new developer permits, granted for the PortAmerica project in 1988.

This development has caused considerable controversy due to its environmental impacts. The Sierra Club voiced strong objections in 1999 saying that construction of National Harbor would "prevent forever the completion of the Potomac Heritage Trail". The site was linked to hundreds of thousands of gallons of untreated sewage being discharged into the Potomac River in 2008. In 2006, Peterson Companies withdrew plans to build a Target department store where the remaining plantation building, the slave quarters, still stand.

Development

The Gaylord National Resort & Convention Center at National Harbor opened on April 1, 2008 in Oxon Hill, Maryland. The site was developed by Milton Peterson's Peterson Companies with the project expected to cost well over $2 billion, and a construction time frame of 2007 to late 2014. As of April 2016 construction was continuing and the cost was set at $4 billion.
In 2010, the development was designated as a census-designated place.

The Walt Disney Company had announced that it would build a new resort hotel at National Harbor, but backed out of the project in November 2011. In 2011, Bonnie Bick, a member of the Campaign to Reinvest in the Heart of Oxon Hill suggested preserving the remaining plantation building, and making it a part of a proposed historical loop of the Potomac Heritage National Scenic Trail, as a draw for the development.

A location for the National Children's Museum opened in December 2012. The museum permanently closed in early January 2015, after having announced that it would relocate back to Washington, D.C. The museum's location is now a Local Motors facility.

On November 29, 2012, ground was broken for a Tanger Outlets shopping facility a mile east of the National Harbor waterfront, which opened in November 2013. The Capital Wheel opened in the mid-year of 2014.

An MGM-branded casino, called MGM National Harbor, opened at National Harbor on December 8, 2016, following voters' approval of an expansion to the state's gambling program in the November 2012 elections. It was built on the south side of the Beltway, about a mile northeast of the National Harbor waterfront.

On January 12, 2015, Peterson Companies announced Local Motors planned to open a location in National Harbor. On June 17, 2016, Local Motors opened their facility to the public and debuted a new vehicle named Olli. The facility includes a showroom of the company's latest vehicles, interactive STEM labs for children, and retail merchandise mostly featuring the company's brand.

Facilities

The site has a convention center, six hotels, restaurants, shops, and condominiums. National Harbor hosted Cirque du Soleil in 2008, 2010, 2012, and 2014 and also features outdoor activities such as a culinary festival and outdoor concerts by military bands, an outdoor movie screen facing the river, an annual ice sculpture exhibition, and a Peeps Day with a Peeps eating contest.  The national spelling bee competition is held there. The Gaylord National Resort & Convention Center, with 2,000 rooms, is the largest hotel between New Jersey and Florida, and the largest in the Washington area.  The site includes a beachfront walking path and a connection to a bike trail on the Woodrow Wilson Bridge that crosses into Alexandria, Virginia.  Amusements include a children's carousel, and the Capital Wheel, a 175-foot Ferris wheel on a pier that extends into the Potomac River.  There is a fast food restaurant and a gas station among the northern ramps that provide the only ways in or out of National Harbor.

In December 2016, MGM Resorts opened MGM National Harbor, a 300-room hotel as wel as a  casino, stores, a spa, restaurants, a 1,200-seat theater, a  convention area, and a  parking garage.

Demographics

2020 census

Note: the US Census treats Hispanic/Latino as an ethnic category. This table excludes Latinos from the racial categories and assigns them to a separate category. Hispanics/Latinos can be of any race.

2010 Census
As of the census of 2010, there were 3,788 people, 1,598 households, and 868 families residing in the census-designated place.  As of 2016, an estimated 7,000 staff work at National Harbor, with 3,000 more expected after the MGM Casino opens in the Fall of 2016.

Geography

Access

The only routes in or out of National Harbor are several ramps north of the area that link it to nearby major roadways: Interstate 95/495 (the Capital Beltway), Interstate 295 (Anacostia Freeway), and Oxon Hill Road. Commuters traveling via Indian Head Highway may access National Harbor by utilizing the Oxon Hill Road exits. Early critics of National Harbor argued that the site is not accessible enough to the Washington Metro, the Washington area's rapid transit system. However, local civic groups dropped a lawsuit against National Harbor's developer in exchange for assurances of greater investment in the surrounding community and better access to mass transit. Three years later, the state funded over $500 million in road improvements in order to handle the 10,000 cars expected to commute daily to National Harbor.

The new Woodrow Wilson Bridge, which forms part of the Capital Beltway near National Harbor, was built to allow capacity for a future Washington Metro line. However, there are no current plans to extend rail over the bridge to development. Instead, the state of Maryland pays $312,000 annually for bus access to National Harbor from the Southern Avenue Metro station. In June 2008, the Gaylord National Resort and Convention Center asked the state to fund additional transit service because employees found it difficult to reach National Harbor.  In 2011, Metro began considering the possibility of building a rail extension to National Harbor off the Green Line as part of its long-term plan.

A water taxi line run by the Potomac Riverboat Company connects the National Harbor to Alexandria, Virginia. The City of Alexandria also runs shuttles from the water taxi terminal to King Street – Old Town Metro station. The service costs the city about $800,000 per year.

On December 15, 2022, NBC Washington reported on WMATA wanting to bring Washington Metrorail service to National Harbor. The proposed plan is to construct a Blue Line loop that "would run from a new, second Rosslyn station through Georgetown, cut across D.C. to Union Station, make a turn south for Navy Yard and Buzzard Point, run down to National Harbor, go across the Wilson Bridge, and link back up with the existing Metro system at Huntington." NBC Washington reports that WMATA "expects to have a final design available for the possible extension" sometime in 2023 and quoted WMATA General Manager Randy Clark as stating this regarding this proposed Blue Line loop: “And without federal money, we probably have no chance of ever doing this line,” he said. “So, that’s why there’s a little sense of, as a region, if we're going to do this, we have the biggest generational amount of money ever at the FTA. The time is now if we're going to do it.”

Education
National Harbor is under the Prince George's County Public Schools district.

Schools serving the CDP are Fort Foote Elementary School, Oxon Hill Middle School, and Oxon Hill High School.

Gallery

Panorama

See also 
 
 Oxon Hill Manor

References

External links 
 www.nationalharbor.com

 Baltimore Business Journal article

Census-designated places in Prince George's County, Maryland
Marinas in the United States
Maryland populated places on the Potomac River
New Urbanism communities
Oxon Hill, Maryland
Ports and harbors of Maryland
Redeveloped ports and waterfronts in the United States
Slave cabins and quarters in the United States
Tourist attractions in Prince George's County, Maryland
Edge cities in the Baltimore-Washington metropolitan area